Joseph or Joe Craven may refer to:

Joe Craven (footballer) (1903–1972), English football player
Joe Craven, American folk, world and roots musician
Joseph Craven (Master of Sidney Sussex College, Cambridge) (1661–1728), Master of Sidney Sussex 1723–1728
Joseph Craven (politician) (1825–1914), British Member of Parliament

See also
Joe Cravens (born 1954), American basketball coach